Patrick James Bates (born November 27, 1970) is a former safety in the National Football League. He was drafted in the 1st round of the 1993 NFL Draft by the Los Angeles Raiders and later played for the Atlanta Falcons after being traded by the Raiders in exchange for the Falcons' second-round selection in the 1996 NFL draft.

Out of high school, Patrick Bates signed with UCLA, but transferred to Texas A&M in 1991. Soon, Bates would become one of the best players of the A&M's famed "Wrecking Crew" of the early 1990s. In 1993, Bates was a first-round draft pick by the Los Angeles Raiders.

After several off-field mishaps, he never realized his full potential, which is why ESPN named him the 37th of the top 50 busts in NFL draft history.

Personal life
As a child, Bates' mother Jean was an alcoholic, and Bates' older brother Jarvis was shot dead when he was 22 and Patrick was still a junior in high school. Bates, Jarvis, and their younger sister Sonia Nicole had spent time under foster care.

During his freshman year at UCLA, Bates' mother and grandmother Isabel Singleton died within a month of each other. Recently in 2019 he “remarried “ and had another child by Whitney S. in Galveston Texas where he now resides.

References

Patrick Bates on Pro Football Reference
No Longer a Raider, and No Longer Miserable, New York Times, Thomas George, May 21, 1996.

1970 births
Living people
People from Galveston, Texas
American football safeties
UCLA Bruins football players
Texas A&M Aggies football players
Los Angeles Raiders players
Oakland Raiders players
Atlanta Falcons players